The Cox Peaks are a series of peaks on a ridge, located  southeast of Mount Crockett, extending eastward from the Hays Mountains of the Queen Maud Mountains and terminating at Scott Glacier. They were mapped by the United States Geological Survey (USGS ) from surveys and from U.S. Navy air photos, 1960–64, and named by the Advisory Committee on Antarctic Names for Allan V. Cox, a USGS geologist at McMurdo Station, 1965–66.

References 

Mountains of the Ross Dependency
Amundsen Coast